David G. Blair (born 1946) is an Australian physicist and professor at the University of Western Australia and Director of the Australian International Gravitational Research Centre. Blair works on methods for the detection of gravitational waves.  He developed the niobium bar gravitational wave detector NIOBE, which achieved the lowest observed noise temperature, and participated in a worldwide collaboration that set the best limit on the burst events in 2001. He has been responsible for numerous innovations including the 1984 invention of the first sapphire clock, a super-precise timepiece designed for space, as well as underpinning the research of the Frequency Stability Group at The University of Western Australia.

In 2003, together with Prof. John de Laeter, Blair founded the Gravity Discovery Centre, a major centre for the promotion of science in Western Australia. In 2010, Blair and collaborating partners developed an educational research program called the Science Education Enrichment Project, to research the benefits of specialist exhibition centres such as the Gravity Discovery Centre.  In 2014, Blair led the Einstein-First Project which aims to introduce Einsteinian Physics at an early age. The project partners included Curtin University, Edith Cowan University, Graham (Polly) Farmer Foundation, U.S. Air Force Academy and the Gravity Discovery Centre.

Honours and recognition
In 2013 Blair was elected Fellow of the American Physical Society; 2007 Western Australian (WA) Premier's Science Award for Scientist of the Year; 2005 World Year of Physics, Blair was awarded the ANZAAS Medal as well as a WA Government Centre of Excellence Grant to develop the Australian International Gravitational Research Centre; 2004 Learning Links Certificate, Minister for Education and Training; 2003 National Medal for Community Service; 2003 Centenary Medal (for Promotion of Science); 2003 Clunies Ross Medal for Science and Technology and in 1995 Blair won the Walter Boas Medal of the Australian Institute of Physics. In 2018 Blair was elected Fellow of the Australian Academy of Science.

Publications
Professor Blair is the co-author of Ripples on a Cosmic Sea: The Search for Gravitational Waves, and the editor of the book The Detection of Gravitational Waves.

References

Presentation of the ANZAAS medal to Professor David Blair 

1946 births
Living people
Australian physicists
Academic staff of the University of Western Australia
Fellows of the Australian Academy of Science